Emotional symbiosis is when an individual has the limited capacity to be aware of, respect, appreciate, and comprehend the subjectivity of another. This occurs in the phase of early development when a child is completely dependent, and both physically and emotionally closely bonded with their mother. Emotional symbiosis is a very common occurrence as it originates from the early childhood treatment of babies. People who have emotional symbiosis tend to put others down in order to make themselves feel as if they have all of the right answers.  Emotional symbiosis is usually hereditary and can have a negative impact on one's family life.

References

  Human Development. Joy Brewster, n.d. Web. 18 Mar. 2014. 
 http://www.discoveryeducation.com/teachers/free-lesson-plans/human-development.cfm

Further reading

Emotional issues
Mental health